The Quezon del Sur creation plebiscite was a plebiscite on the creation of the province of Quezon del Sur from Quezon; the original Quezon province would have been renamed to "Quezon del Norte" had the plebiscite been approved by the residents of Quezon. The plebiscite was held on December 13, 2008, and the result was a slight majority rejecting the creation of the province.

Gumaca would have been the capital of Quezon del Sur, while Lucena would have been retained as Quezon del Norte's capital. Both provinces would have remained part of Calabarzon under their original acronym "zon".

Referendum question
The Quezon del Sur creation plebiscite was supervised and officiated by the COMELEC pursuant to Resolution No. 8553.

The question of the said plebiscite was:

DO YOU APPROVE OF THE CREATION OF THE PROVINCE OF QUEZON DEL SUR, WHICH SHALL BE COMPOSED OF THE MUNICIPALITIES OF AGDANGAN, BUENAVISTA, CATANAUAN, GENERAL LUNA, MACALELON, MULANAY, PADRE BURGOS, PITOGO, SAN ANDRES, SAN FRANCISCO, SAN NARCISO, UNISAN, ALABAT, ATIMONAN, CALAUAG, GUINAYANGAN, GUMACA, LOPEZ, PEREZ, PLARIDEL, QUEZON AND TAGKAWAYAN, AND THE RENAMING OF THE MOTHER PROVINCE OF QUEZON INTO QUEZON DEL NORTE, WHICH SHALL BE COMPOSED OF THE MUNICIPALITIES OF BURDEOS, GENERAL NAKAR, INFANTA, JOMALIG, LUCBAN, MAUBAN, PAGBILAO, PANUKULAN, PATNANUNGAN, POLILLO, REAL, SAMPALOC, TAYABAS CITY, CANDELARIA, DOLORES, SAN ANTONIO, SARIAYA, TIAONG AND LUCENA CITY, PURSUANT TO REPUBLIC ACT NO. 9495 DATED SEPTEMBER 7, 2007?

Background
In 2007, Republic Act No. 9495  was proposed to further divide Quezon into Quezon del Norte and Quezon del Sur. Quezon del Norte was to be composed of the first and second congressional districts of the province (Burdeos, General Nakar, Infanta, Jomalig, Lucban, Mauban, Pagbilao, Panukulan, Patnanungan, Polillo, Real, Sampaloc, Tayabas, Candelaria, Dolores, San Antonio, Sariaya, Tiaong and Lucena City), with Lucena City as its capital. Quezon del Sur, with its capital at Gumaca, would have been composed of the third and fourth congressional districts (Agdangan, Buenavista, Catanauan, General Luna, Macalelon, Mulanay, Padre Burgos, Pitogo, San Andres, San Francisco, San Narciso, Unisan, Alabat, Atimonan, Calauag, Guinayangan, Gumaca, Lopez, Perez, Plaridel, Quezon and Tagkawayan). The act lapsed into law without the signature of President Gloria Macapagal Arroyo on September 7, 2007.

As required by law, the COMELEC held a plebiscite on December 13, 2008, 60 days after Republic Act No. 9495 took effect. Gov. Rafael Nantes, one of the original authors of the law, and Vice Gov. Carlos Portes, opposed the division of the province. Board member Sonny Pulgar and businessman Hobart Dator Jr. launched the "Save Quezon Province Movement." The Comelec allotted P 50 million for the plebiscite. Academician Prof. Joseph Jadway "JJ" Marasigan provided what he called the "strong theoretical framework" that deemed the said split as a step backward. He instead called for the professionalization of service institutions and the differentiation of functions as the answer to the province's increasingly becoming complex environment. He organized students and fellow academicians to oppose such move. His participation resulted in a grave misunderstanding with Lucena Catholic Bishop Emilio Marquez who strongly supported the idea of splitting the province. Marasigan maintained that bishops have no business in dealing with entirely political matters and should refrain from using their influence over their flock. Gov. Rafael Nantes later softened his stand against the proposed creation of Quezon del Sur. Accordingly, upon request of Comelec Chair Jose Melo, a P38 million "Special Allotment Release Order" was issued by the Department of Budget and Management to the Commission on Elections (Philippines) to fund the holding of the plebiscite.

On November 17, 2008, Save Quezon Province Movement (SQPM) asked the Supreme Court of the Philippines to declare Republic Act 9495 as unconstitutional, and to restrain the implementation of a November 12 COMELEC Resolutions Nos. 8533, 8534, 8535, 8537, 8538 and 8539, setting the plebiscite. Yet the plebiscite proceeded with the majority of votes rejecting the division, therefore the split did not push through.

Results

Summary

By administrative division

By proposed province

By congressional district

Notes

External links
Charter of Quezon del Sur

2008 referendums
2008 in the Philippines
Provincial plebiscites in the Philippines
2008 elections in the Philippines
Politics of Quezon
Presidency of Gloria Macapagal Arroyo
Administrative division referendums